Grouch, also known as Rocko's Quest in North America, is a Spanish 3D action, thriller, adventure video game developed by Revistronic Games and published by Big City Games. It was first released in 2000, and later was re-released on May 13, 2003, for Microsoft Windows. The game follows the story of Rocko—a powerful man whose girlfriend is kidnapped by weird creatures that have invaded his country.

Reception 

The following ratings have been given to Rocko's Quest in different sites:

References

External links 
 Rocko's Quest (Windows)

2000 video games
Action video games
Horror video games
Video games developed in Spain
Windows games
Windows-only games
Revistronic games